Tokai Challenger is a solar car from the Japanese Tokai University. The Tokai Challenger became the winner of the 2009 and 2011 World Solar Challenge, a race for solar cars across Australia. The car is designed and tested in collaboration with students from Tokai University and several Japanese companies in the automotive industry.

The Tokai Challenger covered the 2,998 km (1,858 mi.) off in 29 hours 49 minutes and it took an average speed of 100.54 km/h (62 mph).

The Tokai Challenger also became a winner of the 2010 South African Solar Challenge recognized by the International Solarcar Federation (ISF) and the Fédération Internationale de l'Automobile (FIA), a race for solar cars across South Africa. It covered the 4061.8 km (2517 mi.) off in 45 hours 5 minutes and it took an average speed of 90.1 km/h (55 mph).

References

External links

 Official website of the team 
 Technical details 
 Report 

Solar car racing